Peterhead Community Hospital  is located in Peterhead, a coastal town approximately 32 miles north of Aberdeen, Scotland. It is managed by NHS Grampian.

History
The hospital was financed by a gift from W. B. Shewan. It was designed by John Alexander William Grant and involved the conversion of a villa which was acquired in 1934 and the works were completed in 1939. Following extensive redevelopment, new facilities were officially opened by Princess Anne in August 1994.

In August 2005 Aberdeenshire Community Health Partnership issued a consultation document on Older People’s Services, Maternity Services and Diagnostic and Treatment Services which included several proposals for reorganisation of services in the area.

Work to the main hospital entrance was completed in March 2014.

Services
The services provided include a small midwife led maternity unit. The hospital also has a minor injuries unit.

References

External links 
 Buchan Combination, Aberdeenshire

Hospital buildings completed in 1939
NHS Grampian
NHS Scotland hospitals
Hospitals in Peterhead